Kolijan Rostaq-e Sofla Rural District is a rural district (dehestan) in the Central District of Sari County, Mazandaran Province, Iran. At the 2006 census, its population was 16,953, in 4,301 families. The rural district has 12 villages.

References 

Rural Districts of Mazandaran Province
Sari County